John Ayshe (fl. 1589–1608) of Wells, Somerset, was an English politician.

He was a Member (MP) of the Parliament of England for Wells in 1589. He was Mayor of Wells in 1598 and 1608.

References

Year of birth missing
Year of death missing
17th-century English people
Mayors of Wells, Somerset
English MPs 1589